The 1880 West Virginia gubernatorial election took place on October 12, 1880, to elect the governor of West Virginia.

Results

References

1880
gubernatorial
West Virginia
October 1880 events